Port Penrhyn is a harbour located just east of Bangor in north Wales at the confluence of the River Cegin with the Menai Strait. It was formerly of great importance as the main port for the export of slate from the Penrhyn Quarry, the largest slate quarry in the world at the end of the nineteenth century. It was built, and later expanded, by the Pennant (later Douglas-Pennant) family of the nearby Penrhyn Castle.

Penrhyn is the Welsh word for 'promontory'.

References

Further reading

Slate industry in Wales
Ports and harbours of Wales
Bangor, Gwynedd